Ottati (Cilentan: Utatte) is a town and comune in the province of Salerno in the Campania region of south-west Italy. As of 2011 its population was of 680.

History
The town was founded in the 12th century, presumably by shepherds who abandoned the ancient village of Fasanella.

Geography
Located in Cilento and part of its national park,  Ottati lies below Tempa del Prato mountain (1,048 m), part of the Alburni range. It is crossed in the middle by the provincial road SP 179 and the town hall is located in Via 24 Maggio 53. It is 
3 km far from Sant'Angelo a Fasanella, 7 from Corleto Monforte, 8 from Aquara, 9 from Castelcivita, and 92 km from the city of Salerno.

The municipality borders with Aquara, Bellosguardo, Castelcivita, Petina, Sant'Angelo a Fasanella and Sicignano degli Alburni. It has no hamlets (frazioni), but counts the localities of Bivio San Vito and Chiaie, composed by few scattered farmhouses.

Demographics
The municipality of Ottati had a population of 998 inhabitants according to the results of the National Census conducted in 1991. After the National Census of 2001 the population was officially stated to be 809 inhabitants, thereby showing a reduction of 18.94% between 1991 and 2001. The inhabitants are distributed in 345 families with an average of 2,34 people per family.

Economy
There are 6 industrial firms employing 16 people (14.16% of the total of the workers), 21 service firms employing 22 people (19.47% of the total of the workers), 26 firms employing 66 people (58.41% of the total of the workers), 2 administrative offices employing 9 workers (7.96% of the total of the workers). There is a total of 113 workers, that are the 13.97% of the inhabitants of the municipality.

Gallery

See also
Cilentan dialect
Castelcivita Caves

References

External links

Cities and towns in Campania
Localities of Cilento